Javed Akhtar Khan is a Pakistani politician who was a Member of the Provincial Assembly of the Punjab from 2002 to 2007, from May 2013 to May 2018, and from August 2018 till January 2023 .

Early life and education
He was born on 21 March 1962 in Shadan Lund.

He received a degree of Bachelor of Arts from Bahauddin Zakariya University and a degree of Master of Arts in Economics from University of Balochistan in 1987.

Political career

He was elected to the Provincial Assembly of the Punjab as a candidate of National Alliance from Constituency PP-242 (Dera Ghazi Khan-III) in 2002 Pakistani general election. He received 17,796 votes and defeated an independent candidate, Salahuddin Khan Khosa.

He ran for the seat of the Provincial Assembly of the Punjab as a candidate of Pakistan Muslim League (Q) from Constituency PP-242 (Dera Ghazi Khan-III) in 2008 Pakistani general election but was unsuccessful. He received 17,142 votes and lost the seat to Amjad Farooq Khan.

He was elected to the Provincial Assembly of the Punjab as an independent candidate from Constituency PP-242 (Dera Ghazi Khan-III) in 2013 Pakistani general election. He joined Pakistan Muslim League (N) in May 2013.

He was re-elected to Provincial Assembly of the Punjab as a candidate of Pakistan Tehreek-e-Insaf from Constituency PP-287 (Dera Ghazi Khan-III) in 2018 Pakistani general election.

References

Living people
Punjab MPAs 2013–2018
1962 births
Pakistan Muslim League (N) politicians
Punjab MPAs 2002–2007
Pakistan Tehreek-e-Insaf MPAs (Punjab)
Punjab MPAs 2018–2023